Branko Bošković (born 21 June 1980) is a Montenegrin retired footballer, who is best known for playing for his legendary performances with DC United, Red Star Belgrade, Paris Saint-Germain and Rapid Wien.

Club 
Bošković started his pro career in 1996 with the Budva outfit FK Mogren, which was competing in lower Yugoslav division at the time. After playing there for two-and-a-half seasons, Branko earned a dream move to Red Star Belgrade in December 1998.

In his four-and-a-half seasons in Belgrade, he twice helped his team win the Serbo-Montenegrin Football League, in both 1999–2000 and 2000–01, as well as the Yugoslav Cup three times in 1999, 2000 & 2002. Additionally, he marked himself out as a talented and creative midfielder with a nose for goal, all of which earned him a series of national team call-ups. Still, his single most famous moment while at Red Star came during the 2002–03 UEFA Cup Second Round versus Lazio when he scored a goal in the return leg.

Bošković's stellar performances at Red Star got him plenty of attention from abroad, and he moved to French giants Paris Saint-Germain during summer of 2003 but failed to get a first team place upon arrival. Following the two-year stay at PSG – spent mostly out of the first team picture – he accepted a season-long loan to play with Troyes where he spent the entire 2005–06 season. After his loan spell ended, Bošković and PSG parted ways, and he spent a six-month period training with FK Rad.

In January 2007, he signed a contract with Rapid Wien until the end of the 2006–07 season. After impressing during the second half of the 2006–07 season Bošković re-signed with the club. During the 2007–08 season, Bošković was a key player helping the club capture the Austrian league title. As a result of his play, he signed a two-year extension in March 2008. During his time with Rapid, Bošković appeared in 122 official matches and scored 24 goals.

Bošković signed as a Designated Player with D.C. United of Major League Soccer in the United States on 14 June 2010. Bošković made 43 appearances, 21 starts and finished with two goals and seven assists over three seasons.  Following the end of the 2012 season, Bošković and D.C. United mutually agreed to part ways, with Bošković citing a desire to return to Montenegro for family reasons.

He returned to his former club Rapid Wien in January 2013. In summer 2014, he left Rapid after his contract had expired.

International 
He made his debut for FR Yugoslavia against Brazil, in a friendly played 27 March 2002. He played his last match against South Korea in a friendly on 16 November 2005. In total he played 12 games – eight friendlies and four Euro 2004 qualifying matches – for FR Yugoslavia/Serbia and Montenegro. He scored one goal for the national side, coming in a 1–2 loss against Azerbaijan on 11 June 2003 during Euro 2004 qualifying.

With the formation of Montenegro, he was selected to the Montenegro national team, debuting for the nation in its first-ever match in March 2007 against Hungary. He was captain in the European Championship qualifier against England at Wembley in 2010, which ended in a goalless draw, his last international match to the end of 2011. He played again against Belarus in a 1–1 draw in 2013. He played for the first time in World Cup 2014 qualifier against Poland and provided an assist for Dejan Damjanović. He scored an extraordinary own goal 'for' England in a 2014 World Cup qualifier at Wembley which ended 4–1 against Montenegro.

International goals

Serbia and Montenegro

Montenegro

Honours
Red Star Belgrade
Yugoslav First League: 1999–2000, 2000–01
Yugoslav Cup: 2002
Paris Saint-Germain
Coupe de France: 2004
SK Rapid Wien
Austrian Football Bundesliga: 2007–08

Statistics 

Appearances and goals counted correct as of 6 October 2012

References

External links
 
 
 Branko Bošković at FootballDatabase.com
 
  
 Branko Bošković at Playerhistory 
 Branko Bošković at Rapid Statistics
 

1980 births
Living people
People from Bačka Topola
Association football midfielders
Serbia and Montenegro footballers
Serbia and Montenegro international footballers
Montenegrin footballers
Montenegro international footballers
Dual internationalists (football)
FK Mogren players
Red Star Belgrade footballers
Paris Saint-Germain F.C. players
ES Troyes AC players
SK Rapid Wien players
D.C. United players
Second League of Serbia and Montenegro players
First League of Serbia and Montenegro players
Ligue 1 players
Austrian Football Bundesliga players
Major League Soccer players
Designated Players (MLS)
Serbia and Montenegro expatriate footballers
Expatriate footballers in France
Serbia and Montenegro expatriate sportspeople in France
Montenegrin expatriate footballers
Expatriate footballers in Austria
Montenegrin expatriate sportspeople in Austria
Expatriate soccer players in the United States
Montenegrin expatriate sportspeople in the United States